Besora may refer to:

Besora Castle, a castle in Catalonia
Joaquim Besora (born 1980), a Spanish-born Andorran footballer and former futsal player

See also

Bessora (born 1968), a French-language writer